Wolfgang Amadeus Mozart's Horn Concerto No. 2 in E-flat major, K. 417 was completed in 1783. 

The concerto is scored for solo horn and an orchestra of two oboes, two horns, and strings. This is one of two horn concerti of Mozart to omit bassoons. It is also one of Mozart's two horn concerti to have ripieno horns (horns included in the orchestra besides the soloist), though in contrast to K. 495, the solo horn in this one does not duplicate the first ripieno horn's part in the tutti passages.

Mozart's good-natured ribbing of his friend is evident in the manuscript inscription "W. A. Mozart took pity on Leitgeb, ass, ox and fool in Vienna on 27 May 1783."

Structure
The work is in three movements:

 Allegro
 Andante
 Rondo Allegro, Più allegro 6/8

Discography
Given its duration (no more than 20 minutes), the Concerto is typically grouped with Mozart's other 3 for the instrument. The foremost example  is Dennis Brain's November 1953 recording of the four horn concertos on EMI with The Philharmonia Orchestra conducted by Herbert von Karajan.
 2018: Javier Bonet (horn); Munich Radio Orchestra, Hermann Baumann (conductor), ARSIS. A recording with all the Mozart horn Concertos including the Rondó KV 371 and the Horn quintet KV 407

References

External links

 

Horn concertos by Wolfgang Amadeus Mozart
Compositions in E-flat major
1783 compositions